The carapine grenadier (Coryphaenoides carapinus) is a species of deep-sea fish in the family Macrouridae.

Its name (pronounced ) refers to its resemblance to the Carapus pearlfishes.

Description

The carapine grenadier is pale grey with a peppering of melanophores. It has a narrow band of pointed teeth in the premaxillae.

Habitat

Behaviour
The carapine grenadier feeds on polychaete worms, copepods, amphipods, isopods and mysids.

References

Macrouridae
Fish described in 1883
Taxa named by George Brown Goode
Taxa named by Tarleton Hoffman Bean